Gelu Vlașin (born 30 August 1966) is a Romanian poet and essayist.

Born in Telciu, Bistrița-Năsăud County, Romania on 30 August 1966, he is married to Cristina Maria Vlasin (music teacher and jazz singer) and has a son Darius Andrei Vlasin (born in Madrid on 4 December 2009). Had his literary debut in România Literară Magazine 16/1999, with an introduction made by Nicolae Manolescu; his editorial debut was in 1999 with the poetry volume Tratat la psihiatrie (Cured at Psychiatry), published at Vinea Publisher, Bucharest, with a preface by Nicolae Manolescu and an afterword by Paul Cernat; The volume won the award of the debut section of the Bucharest Writers Association in 1999 and was a nominee at the Romanian Union of Writers Awards, 1999.

Works

His debut as a writer was in 1999, in România Literară magazine.

Poetry
Tratat la psihiatrie - Ed. Vinea, Bucarest - 1999 / Editura Liternet - 2006,
Atac de panică - Noesis, Bucarest - 2000 & Ed. Muzeul Literaturii Române, Bucarest - 2002,
Poemul Turn - Colecția "Biblioteca Bucarest" - Asociația Scriitorilor din București  & Ed. Azero - 2005,
Ultima suflare - Ed. Muzeul Literaturii Române, Bucuresti / A.S.B. - 2001 & Editura Liternet - 2003
Omul decor  - Ed.Brumar, Timișoara, 2009
Ayla - Ed. Cartea Românească, Bucarest, 2011

Collaboration with Literary Magazines

Gelu Vlașin published poetry, essay and literary reviews in the majority of the literary magazines from Romania also in magazines from United States, Canada, Spain, Germany, France, Italy, Russia, Morocco, Argentina, Mexico, Australia, Hungary and Israel.

Essays

Don Quijote Rătăcitorul Eikon Publishing House, 2009

Professional Activities

Member of USR Romanian Writers Union (2000)
Member of the National Council of USR - Romanian Writers Union (2009)
Member of Monitoring and Suspension Commission USR - Romanian Writers Union (2010)
Member of ASB – Bucharest Writers Association(2000)
Member of  the Leading Commission  of Poetry Section from ASB Bucharest Writers Association (2009)
President of the Association Hispano-Romanian Dialogo Europeo (2007)
First Vice-President of FEDROM – Federation of the Romanian Associations in Spain (2008)
President of  DIVERBIUM -Madrid (2009)
Founder  & Coordinator of online literary network Reţeaua literară
Founder  & Coordinator of The Club of the Romanians all-over the world  România din Diaspora
Founder  & Coordinator al Literary Club DIVERBIUM from Madrid

Literary Prizes

Also he won some prestigious national and international awards:

Tertulia Cerro Almodovar Award – Madrid 2004
Puertas Abiertas Award – Madrid 2002
Colocviile Cosbuc Award, 2000
Debut Award of Bucharest Writers Association 1999
The International Festival of Sighet Award 2000
The Great Award Ion Vinea 1999
Cristian Popescu Award 1999
Liviu Rebreanu Salons Award 1999

References

 Nicolae Manolescu prezentare Tratat la Psihiatrie
 Paul Cernat jocul la zero, on line (hipertext critic)
 Claudiu Komartin Poetul turn
 Violeta Savu Revista Ateneu
 Octavian Soviany Monolog în Computerland
 Ana Dragu interviu cu Gelu Vlasin la CityNews
 Menut Maximinian despre Omul decor
 Petrisor Militaru Poemele lui Gelu Vlașin și acul magnetic al cititorului
 Cristina Nemerovschi Am fost și sunt un veșnic călător
 Sorin Mihai Grad Gelu Vlasin - prezentare
 Patrick Calinescu Împotriva previzibilului
 Luiza Mitu Dincolo de zbor nu se poate trece fără înălțare
 Igor Ursenco Alteritate poetică pe muchia periculoasă a gîndului
 Ormeny Francisc Norbert „Atac de panică” sau à la recherche de la femme perdue în fono-grafii My Dying Bride
 Cristina Nemerovschi Depresii, fobii, amnezii
 Gelu Diaconu „Scriitorul nu este un boem prost imbracat care umbla tot timpul beat!”
 Elena Alexa Poetul care a muncit la cules de struguri si cirese
 Emanuela Ilie Gelu Vlașin, despre rătăcirile iberice ale mioriticului Don Quijote

External links

Situl personal al poetului
Blog personal - Reteaua literara 
Prezentare carte în "Răsunetul"
Articole publicate in pagina de cultura - "Ziarul Financiar"
Articole publicate la "Liternet"
Tratat la psihiatrie - Editura LiterNet
Poemul Turn - Editura LiterNet
Articol prezentare - "Mediafax"
Interviu al poetului în "Citynews"
Prezentare în ziarul Adevărul
Revista Clouds Magazine
Revista Respiro
Antología de Poesía Rumana 
Soign´e `a l’hˆopital psychiatrique
Revue d’art et de littérature, musique
LITERNET - Deprimismele literaturii române de azi

People from Bistrița-Năsăud County
Romanian essayists
20th-century Romanian poets
Romanian male poets
1966 births
Living people
Male essayists
21st-century Romanian poets
20th-century essayists
21st-century essayists
20th-century Romanian male writers
21st-century male writers